Blackcircles.com is a United Kingdom online tyre retailer.

History
It was founded by the Liverpool-born entrepreneur Mike Welch in 2002 and sells to around 2,000,000 customers in the UK – making it one of the largest online tyre retailers in the country.

Approach
Customers book and pay for their tyres online before having them fitted at one of their network of 2,500+ fitting centres. The company has offices in the Scottish capital, Edinburgh. Blackcircles franchises were launched in 2006, allowing independent garages to sign up to its stock-checking and ordering system.
The company has about 100 thousand customers in the UK, one of the largest online tire retailers in the UK.
In May 2015 tyre manufacturer Michelin purchased the company for $75m. Michelin, which boasts 112,300 employees and operates 68 production plants in 17 countries, will also link Blackcircles with its popular distributor ATS Euromaster.

In January 2016, CEO & founder Mike Welch was appointed an OBE in the Queen's New Year's honours list. The award was in recognition to his services to business and voluntary services for adoption & fostering. Welch’s charitable activities centre on the myadoptedfamily.com / The Welch Trust website, which aims to create positive disruption in the highly bureaucratic adoption sector.

As of November 2017, Graeme Cole became CEO of Blackcircles.com.

Notes

 Sir Terry Leahy-backed tyre etailer Blackcircle.com eyes European deal as sales soar | News | Retail Week

External links
Official UK Website
Official Canadian Website
Official Thai Website

Automotive companies of the United Kingdom
Online retailers of the United Kingdom